William Manning (1 December 1763 – 17 April 1835) was a British merchant, politician, and Governor of the Bank of England.

Biography
Manning was the son of West India merchant William Coventry Manning and Elizabeth Ryan. Manning's sister Martha married American Revolutionary War patriot John Laurens. 

Manning joined his father's firm, taking control after his father's death in 1791. He was elected a Director of the Bank of England from 1792 to 1831 and its Governor between 1812 and 1814, having served as its Deputy Governor from 1810 to 1812. 

He worked as a merchant in the West Indies, acting as agent for St Vincent (1792-1806) and for Grenada (1825-1831). He also invested in the Australian Agricultural Company, becoming its Deputy Governor in 1826, and was president of the London Life Assurance from 1817 to 1830. The Manning River in New South Wales, Australia was named in his honour.

Around the same time, he and several other merchants lobbied Secretary for Colonies William Huskisson for exclusive trading rights with New Zealand. A "William Mannings" is listed as  a director of the New Zealand Company in 1825, a venture chaired by the wealthy John George Lambton, Whig MP (and later 1st Earl of Durham), that made the first attempt to colonise New Zealand. 

Between 1794 and 1830 he served almost continuously as a Member of Parliament in turn for Evesham, Lymington and Penryn. He was a prominent slave owner and member of the West India Committee. He was active politically trying to prevent the abolition of slavery.

Personal life

He married twice; firstly Elizabeth, daughter of banker Abel Smith of Nottingham, with whom he had 2 daughters and secondly Mary, daughter of barrister Henry Lannoy Hunter of Beech Hill, Reading, Berkshire with whom he had 4 sons and 4 daughters.

He inherited Copped Hall, Totteridge, Hertfordshire, where his second wife Mary Hunter re-designed the grounds, probably with the advice of Humphry Repton, damming the Folly Brook to create the ornamental Darland's Lake.

After the death of Lord Frederick Campbell in 1816, he bought Combe Bank near Sevenoaks, Kent from Campbell's daughter. However, he got into financial difficulties in the 1820s and had to declare himself bankrupt in 1831. He was forced to resign from the Bank of England, sell his estates and move to a smaller property in Gower Street, London.

William Manning died at Gower Street in 1835 and was buried at Sundridge, Kent.

One son, Henry Manning, was ordained as an Anglican clergyman and became a leader of the Oxford Movement, later converting to Catholicism and becoming the Archbishop of Westminster in 1865.

Notes

References

External links 
 

1763 births
1835 deaths
Deputy Governors of the Bank of England
Governors of the Bank of England
West Indies merchants
Members of the Parliament of Great Britain for Plympton Erle
British MPs 1790–1796
British MPs 1796–1800
Members of the Parliament of the United Kingdom for English constituencies
Members of the Parliament of the United Kingdom for Penryn
UK MPs 1801–1802
UK MPs 1802–1806
UK MPs 1806–1807
UK MPs 1807–1812
UK MPs 1812–1818
UK MPs 1818–1820
UK MPs 1820–1826
UK MPs 1826–1830
People associated with King's College London
Members of the Parliament of the United Kingdom for Lymington
British slave owners
Tory MPs (pre-1834)